Mga Nagbabagang Bulaklak is a 2011 Philippine drama series produced and aired by TV5 from March 21, 2011 to June 17, 2011. Starring Sheryl Cruz, Ruffa Gutierrez, Arci Muñoz, Carla Humphries, Valerie Concepcion and the Star Factor finalist Ritz Azul, it was directed by Jon Red. 

The series is a controversial show by Benedict Migue that displays events within and outside of the broadcast industry, particularly on television.

Synopsis
Rosal Flores (Sheryl Cruz) is a former dancer who is apprehensive of her daughters’ involvement in show business. She knows the temptations and dangers of the industry. Her daughters Dahlia (Arci Muñoz) and Daisy (Ritz Azul) repeat Rosal's experiences as the story unfolds. 
Dahlia and Daisy get enmeshed in show business in their pursuit of their dream to become successful dancers/actors.

Cast

Main cast
Sheryl Cruz as Rosal Flores
Carla Humphries as Camella / Ivy Amor / Irish
Valerie Concepcion as Violet Alindogan
Ruffa Gutierrez as Orchidia Ortega a.k.a. Ms. O
Arci Muñoz as Dahlia Flores / Carnation
Ritz Azul as Daisy Flores
Christine Young as Lily

Supporting cast
Richard Gomez as Apollo Ortega a.k.a. Mr. A
Phillip Salvador as Zeus Montemayor a.k.a. Mr. Z
Carmina Manzano as Pilar Osmundo a.k.a. Ipil Ipil
James Blanco as Eros
Jay Aquitania as Hector
Victor Basa as Marco Montemayor
Allan Paule as Artemio Flores
Jean Saburit as Mrs. Montemayor
Mel Martinez as Magnolia
Rufa Mi as Makahiya
Luningning as Frida
Milagring as Pia
Mariposa as Ness

Extended cast
Jon Avila as Boris Delgado
Rosanna Roces as Daffodil
Gabo Clint as Ulyses
 Edward James Baviera as Dyaggo

Soundtrack
The official theme song of Mga Nagbabagang Bulaklak  is "Init sa Magdamag", performed by Marvin Ong and Maffy Soler. It was originally performed by Nonoy Zuñiga. The duets were popularized by Basil Valdez and Sharon Cuneta.

Syndication
 Kenya - 2012 - KTN Kenya
 Vietnam - TodayTV VTC7 - September 9, 2013/SNTV SCTV6 - April 25, 2014

See also
List of programs broadcast by TV5 (Philippine TV network)
List of programs aired by TV5 (Philippine TV network)

References

External links

TV5 (Philippine TV network) drama series
Philippine melodrama television series
2011 Philippine television series debuts
2011 Philippine television series endings
Philippine drama television series
Filipino-language television shows